AiRI (born September 13) (previously known under the stage name UR@N) is a Japanese singer signed to Lantis. She is best known for performing "Dreamer", the opening theme to the anime Tari Tari, and the song "Dream Scramble", which is used as the opening theme to the anime Keijo.

Discography

Albums
 Puzzle (2012) - Oricon peak at #77
 Color (2013) - Oricon peak at #60
 Mirage (2014) - Oricon peak at #69
 Smash!!! (mini album; 2015) - Oricon peak at #140

Singles
 "Learn Together" (2011) - Oricon peak at #92
 "Unmei/ Futatsu no Ashiato（運命 / 二人の足跡)" (2011) - Oricon peak at #83
 "Pieces" (2011) - Oricon peak at #34
 "Kimi to Boku wa Soko ni ita (君と僕はそこにいた" (2012)
 "Dreamer" (2012) - Oricon peak at #21
 "Imagination > Reality" (2013) - Oricon peak at #83
 "DREAMxSCRAMBLE" (2016) - Oricon peak at #119

References

External links 

Anime musicians
Japanese women singers
Lantis (company) artists
Living people
Year of birth missing (living people)